Wailuku is a census-designated place (CDP) in and county seat of Maui County, Hawaii, United States. The population was 17,697 at the 2020 census.

Wailuku is located just west of Kahului, at the mouth of the Iao Valley. In the early 20th century Wailuku was the main tourist destination on Maui, though it has since been eclipsed with the rise of the resort towns such as Kaanapali.

Historic sites in the town include Kaʻahumanu Church (named after Queen Kaʻahumanu, wife of Kamehameha I) which dates to 1876, the Wailuku Civic Center Historic District, the site of the Chee Kung Tong Society Building, and the Bailey House, a 19th-century former seminary and home that houses a history museum and the Maui Historical Society.

There are two ancient temples near Wailuku, called  — the Halekiʻi Heiau and the Pihanakalani Heiau.  Both date back hundreds of years and were used for religious purposes by the native Hawaiians.

Wailuku is served by Kahului Airport.

Geography 

Wailuku is located at  (20.891923, -156.502177) between the CDPs of Waihee-Waiehu to the north, Kahului to the east, and Waikapu to the south.

The three moku or districts of west Maui are Lāhaina, Kāʻanapali, and Wailuku. Wailuku is also known as Pūʻalikomohana, or Nā Wai ʻEhā which means the four waters. The four waters are the ahupuaʻa (smaller land division than district), which are Waikapū, Wailuku, Waiʻehu, and Waiheʻe.

History 

Home to Maui's most famous Hawaiian rulers, site of Kamehameha's decisive 1790 victory at the Battle of Kepaniwai in the Iao Valley, location of the 19th century Mission Station and birthplace of the mighty sugar industry, Wailuku illustrates the powerful influences which shaped the town, the island and the state.

The area was a center of power and population in pre-historic Hawaii. In the mid-1800s it was irrevocably changed when New England missionaries brought their religious beliefs, western skills and implements and new agricultural methods. By the 1860s the Wailuku Sugar Company (owned by C. Brewer & Co.) and other plantations were busy growing and milling sugarcane. Miles of ditches were dug, bringing irrigation water from deep in the mountains to the vast fields of central Maui, and the sugar industry flourished, to the detriment of the native people.

Thousands of skilled and unskilled workers immigrated to Maui from all parts of the world to toil in the fields and factories. They came from China, Japan, Okinawa, Korea, the Philippines, Europe, America – bringing ethnic, cultural and religious diversity to their new home. Many settled in Wailuku, where houses, schools, churches, temples, shops, banks and community buildings were built to meet the needs of the thriving company town.

In 1905, Wailuku was designated Maui's County Seat, and it soon became a hub of government, business and entertainment, boasting vaudeville and movie theatres, bowling alley, hotels, poi factory, ice and soda works, and many markets and offices. Thus began the era of growth which continued until the late 1960s when the sugar industry, losing its economic prosperity, reduced operations and the development of alternative commercial centers drew business away from Wailuku's downtown streets.

Many private and public buildings have architectural and historical significance. Beyond this stylish neighborhood are the narrow lanes where modest bungalow, amidst colorful gardens, preserve the flavor of old Wailuku. On upper Main Street (the road to Iao Valley), are remnants of the missionary era. A tiny graveyard contains tombstones of Hawaiian Ali’i (royalty) and missionary families. Further uphill are the Alexander House and Bailey House, now an excellent museum displaying ancient Hawaiian artifacts and missionary period rooms, and office of the Maui Historical society. A turn on Ilina Street to the top of Vineyard Street brings you to an interesting cemetery with lovely views of the Iao Valley and West Maui Mountains.

Follow Vineyard downhill through a charming neighborhood clustered around the Iao Congregational Church. The mature trees, varied architecture and serene vistas recreate the atmosphere of bygone days. As you approach the center of town, new buildings mingle with old, and former residences or commercial buildings have been rehabilitated for modern uses, keeping the colorful appearance of the past. In the business district, where false fronts and art deco facades stand shoulder to shoulder, sidewalks are shaded by canopies, inviting you to stroll and explore the charms of Old Wailuku Town.

In the Hawaiian tongue Wailuku means literally "destroying water." The Hawaiian god Kāne is considered to be the procreator and the provider of life. He is associated with wai (fresh water) as well as clouds, rain, streams and springs. Kanaloa, the Hawaiian god of the underworld, is represented by the phallic stone of the ʻĪao Needle.

Kapawa, the king of Hawaiʻi prior to Pili, was buried here. Maui's ruler Kakaʻe, in the late 15th century, designated ʻĪao Valley as an aliʻi burial ground. The remains were buried in secret places. In 1790, the Battle of Kepaniwai took place there, in which Kamehameha the Great defeated Kalanikūpule and the Maui army during his campaign to unify the islands. The battle was said to be so bloody that dead bodies blocked ʻĪao Stream, and the battle site was named Kepaniwai ("the damming of the waters").

Demographics 

As of the census of 2000, there were 12,296 people, 4,535 households, and 3,015 families residing in the CDP. The racial makeup of the CDP was 42.08% Asian, 26.28% from two or more races, 11.70% Pacific Islander, 8.16% White, 1.18% from other races, 0.36% Native American and 0.24% African American. Hispanic or Latino of any race were 7.75% of the population.

There were 4,535 households, out of which 29.1% had children under the age of 18 living with them, 48.4% were married couples living together, 12.7% had a female householder with no husband present, and 33.5% were non-families. 25.7% of all households were made up of individuals, and 8.2% had someone living alone who was 65 years of age or older.  The average household size was 2.71 and the average family size was 3.28.

In the CDP the population was spread out, with 23.7% under the age of 18, 7.1% from 18 to 24, 30.3% from 25 to 44, 23.9% from 45 to 64, and 15.1% who were 65 years of age or older.  The median age was 38 years. For every 100 females, there were 99.4 males.  For every 100 females age 18 and over, there were 97.0 males.

The median income for a household in the CDP was $45,587, and the median income for a family was $51,441. Males had a median income of $33,429 versus $26,487 for females. The per capita income for the CDP was $20,503.  About 8.1% of families and 11.2% of the population were below the poverty line, including 14.7% of those under age 18 and 3.8% of those age 65 or over.

Economy 
Major employers in Wailuku include Towne Island Homes, Maui Memorial Medical Center, Kaiser Permanente, Maui County, the Pacific Whale Foundation, Maui Ocean Center, The Maui News, Maui Community Correctional Center, and Bayada Home Health Care.

Sports 
Wailuku is the birthplace of two Major League Baseball players, Shane Victorino and Kurt Suzuki. From 2010 to 2013, Wailuku was home to its own baseball team, Na Koa Ikaika Maui.

The Maui Bowling Center, which has hosted a strong number of local bowling leagues since its grand opening in 1948, is located in Wailuku. The building was originally constructed in 1945 as a furniture store but was later converted in 1948 for use as a ten-lane bowling alley. The alley utilized manual pin-setters from its opening until 1961, when it converted to automatic setting machines. The building stands at the corner of Market Street and Vineyard Street.

Points of interest 
Iao Theater
Iao Valley
Tropical Gardens of Maui
Duke "The Duke" Kahanamoku's (Ambassador of Aloha) Surfboard at The Bailey House Museum

References 

Census-designated places in Maui County, Hawaii
County seats in Hawaii
Populated places on Maui
Populated coastal places in Hawaii